Commelina diffusa, sometimes known as the climbing dayflower or spreading dayflower, is a pantropical herbaceous plant in the dayflower family. It has been introduced to the southeastern United States where it is most common in wet disturbed soils. There are two recognised varieties, one being the type and the other being C. diffusa var. gigas, which is native to Asia and has been introduced to Florida. It flowers from spring to fall and is most common in disturbed situations, moist places and forests. In China the plant is used medicinally as a febrifuge and a diuretic. A blue dye is also extracted from the flower for paints. In the Hawaiian Islands, it is known as "honohono grass", although it is technically not a grass. "Honohono" refers to the alternating structure of the leaves.  At least one publication lists it as an edible plant in New Guinea.

Description
Commelina diffusa is typically an annual herb, though it may be perennial in the tropics. It spreads diffusely, creeping along the ground, branching heavily and rooting at the nodes, obtaining stem lengths up to 1 metre. Pubescence on the stem is variable and ranges from glabrous to hispidulous, which can occur either in a line or throughout. The leaf blades are relatively variable, ranging from lanceolate to ovate, with proximal leaves tending to be more oblong. They measure 3 to 12 cm in length by 0.8 to 3 cm in width. North American populations tend to have smaller leaf size, typically measuring 1.5 to 5 cm, by 0.5 by 1.8 cm. The leaf apex is acute to acuminate. The leaf surface can be either glabrous (i.e. hairless) or hispid (i.e. bristly). The leaves are subsessile (i.e. having a very small petiole) with a leaf sheath striped with red and covered with hispid pubescence.

The flowers are arranged into cincinni (singular: cincinnus), or scorpioid cymes. This is a form of a monochasium where the lateral branches arise alternately on opposite sides of the false axis. There are typically two cincinni present, with the lower cincinnus bearing 2 to 4 flowers, while the upper cincinnus has one to several flowers. The upper cincinnus is generally exerted on specimens with larger spathes, but it may be included in specimens with smaller spathes. The upper cincinnus bears only male flowers and has a longer peduncle, while the lower cincinnus bears bisexual flowers on a shorter peduncle. The pedicels supporting single flowers, and later the fruits, are thick and curved and measure about 3 to 5 mm. The membranous sepals are inconspicuous at only 3 to 4 mm in length. The petals are blue, though may be lavender in rare cases. The upper two petals measure 4.2 to 6 mm. The anther connective (i.e. the tissue connecting the two halves of the anther) of the centre-most stamen has a broad transverse band of violet. The spathes are solitary, borne on a peduncle and typically falcate (i.e. sickle-shaped) with a cordate (i.e. heart-shaped) to rounded base, acuminate apices and can be either glabrous or hispidulous (i.e. minutely hispid) beneath. They usually measure 0.8 to 2.5 cm long, but may be as short as 0.5 cm and as long as 4 cm. They are typically 0.4 by 1.2 cm wide, but may be up to 1.4 cm long. Their peduncles are usually 0.5 to 2 cm long and rarely up to 2.9 cm. Flowering occurs from May to November. Pollens are elongated with bilateral symmetry, approximate size is 73 microns.

The fruit is a capsule which has three locules and 2 valves. It measures 4 to 6.3 mm long by 3 to 4 mm wide, though it may be as narrow as 2.1 mm. They contain five brown seeds that are 2 to 2.8, rarely up to 3.2 mm long, by 1.4 to 1.8 mm wide. They are deeply reticulate (i.e. net-like). The chromosome number is 2n = 30.

Distribution and habitat
The plant is present in tropical and subtropical locations worldwide. It can be found throughout much of southern China, specifically in the provinces of Guangdong, southwestern Guangxi, southwestern Guizhou, Hainan, southeastern Xizang and southeastern Yunnan. In Japan the plant has been reported from Yakushima off Kyūshū and is also present in the Ryukyu Islands from Amami Ōshima southwards.

It is native in parts of the West Indies, including much of Puerto Rico and several of the Virgin Islands such as Saint Croix, Saint Thomas and Tortola. It has also been introduced to the southeastern United States where it is present from Maryland in the north, west to Missouri and south to Texas and Florida. It has also been introduced to Hawaii, where it is a common and quickly spreading weed. The variety C. diffusa var. gigas has been introduced to Florida.

In China it can be found from sea level up to 2100 metres, and is typically associated with forests, thickets, stream banks and other open and humid habitats. In the West Indies it is a common weed that is especially associated with roadsides, moist ditches and waste places and it can be found from sea level to 1050 metres. In the United States it is also typical of disturbed locations, such as gardens, cultivated areas and lawns, but can also be found in woods and other moist situations.

Uses
Within China, Commelina diffusa is used as a medicinal herb with febrifugal and diuretic effects. A dye is also obtained from the juice of the petals for use in painting.

Within Hawaii, "honohono grass" was used as medicine to aid with deep cuts. While other Hawaiian herbs just get superficial cuts, honohono grass is an herb to aid with deeper troubling issues.

According to a work by Bruce French published on papuaweb.org, the young leaf tips are cooked and eaten in New Guinea.  (See page 80.)

References

External links

 Profile at Flora of Missouri Webpage
 Ethnopharmacognosy Series II: Pharmaceutical and Nutraceutical Values of Honohono Grass

Diffusa
Flora of Asia
Flora of Africa
Flora of North America
Flora of South America
Least concern plants
Least concern flora of North America
Least concern flora of Oceania
Plants described in 1768
Pantropical flora
Taxa named by Nicolaas Laurens Burman